Sands of Time is the sixth album by the R&B band the S.O.S. Band, released on the Tabu label in April 1986. It was produced by Jimmy Jam and Terry Lewis. This would be the last album to feature original lead singer Mary Davis before she left the group to embark on a solo career.

History
The album peaked at No. 4 on the R&B albums chart. It also reached No. 44 on the Pop albums chart. The lead single, "The Finest", reached the Billboard R&B Top Ten, peaking at No. 2. The single also peaked at No. 44 on the Billboard Hot 100, No. 8 on the Hot Dance Club Play chart and No. 17 on the UK Singles Chart. Three follow-up singles, "Borrowed Love", "Even When You Sleep", and "No Lies" also reached the R&B chart, peaking at No. 14, No. 34, and No. 43, respectively. "No Lies" peaked at No. 2 on the Hot Dance Club Play chart.

Track listing

Personnel
Jason Bryant – keyboards, lead vocals
Mary Davis – lead and background vocals
Billy Ellis – saxophone
Sonny Killebrew – saxophone
Abdul Ra'oof – trumpet, lead vocals
John Simpson – bass
Bruno Speight – guitar
Jerome Thomas – drums, percussion

Additional personnel
Jimmy Jam, Terry Lewis, Jellybean Johnson, Stewart Hanley, Kurt Mitchel – musicians
Mark Smith – background vocals
Cherrelle, Alexander O'Neal – special guest vocalists (on "The Finest")
Terry Lewis, Lisa Keith, Jellybean Johnson, Jimmy Jam, Jerome Benton, Fredi Grace, Lloyd Oby – vocalists

Production
Jimmy Jam and Terry Lewis – producers, executive producers, recording engineers, assistant engineers
The S.O.S. Band – producers (on "Two Time Lover" and "Do You Still Want To?")
Tom Race – recording engineer
Steve Hodge – assistant engineer, mixing engineer
Brian Gardner – mastering engineer
Robin Tucker – A&R coordinator
Dale Wehlacz – art direction, design, illustration

Charts

Weekly charts

Year-end charts

Singles

References

External links
 Sands of Time at Discogs

1986 albums
Albums produced by Jimmy Jam and Terry Lewis
Tabu Records albums
The S.O.S. Band albums